Murie was a railway station on the Walhalla narrow gauge line in Gippsland, Victoria, Australia. The station was opened in 1910 and was closed on 22 April 1914.  In lieu of Murie station, Knott's Siding, located a half-mile towards Moe, was opened to passenger traffic.

References

Disused railway stations in Victoria (Australia)
Railway stations in Australia opened in 1910
Transport in Gippsland (region)
Shire of Baw Baw
Walhalla railway line